RTFM is the expression "Read the fucking manual".

RTFM may also refer to:

 RT FAQ Manager, a knowledge base application Request Tracker
 Ray Tracing Figure of Merit, often used in the context of ray tracing or BRL-CAD
 RTFM (album), an album by Poster Children

See also
 RTM (disambiguation)